This is a list of supermarket chains in Egypt.

Private sector stores 
 Abdullah AlOthaim Markets
 Abu Ashara
 Abu Zikry
 ABA Market
 Alfa Supermarkets
 Awlad Ragab 
 BIM
 Carrefour
 Elmahmal (Sold to Awlad Ragab)
 Fathalla Gomla Market
 Gourmet Egypt
 Hyper One
 Kazyon
 Kheir Zaman
 Lulu Hypermarket
 Makro (Metro Cash & Carry, closed in Egypt)
 Metro Markets (different from Metro Cash & Carry)
 Oscar
 Panda 
 Seoudi
 Spinneys
 Zad (Closed)
 Zahran
 omar Effendi

Public sector stores 
 Asmak 2000 market
 Family market
 New market 
 Delta market 
 Masria market
 Alex market
 Aman stores (owned to Egyptian Police)
 National service projects organisation stores ( owned to Egyptian Armed Forces )
 public service organisation stores (owned to Egyptian Armed Forces )

See also
 List of supermarket chains in Africa
 List of supermarket chains

References

External links
 Grocery retailers in Egypt
 Shopping areas in Egypt

Egypt
Supermarket chains

Supermarket chains
Egypt